
Nations League may refer to:

Sports

Association football
 CONCACAF Nations League
 CONCACAF W Gold Cup
 UEFA Nations League
 UEFA Women's Nations League

Volleyball
 FIVB Volleyball Men's Nations League
 FIVB Volleyball Women's Nations League

See also
 League of Nations, a worldwide intergovernmental organisation 1920–1946
 League of Nations (professional wrestling), a professional wrestling stable
 National League (disambiguation)